The 2018 Thindown Challenger Biella was a professional tennis tournament played on outdoor red clay courts. It was part of the 2018 ATP Challenger Tour. It took place in Biella, Italy between 17 and 23 September 2018.

Singles main-draw entrants

Seeds

 Rankings are as of 10 September 2018.

Other entrants
The following players received wildcards into the singles main draw:
  Enrico Dalla Valle
  Paolo Lorenzi
  Andrea Pellegrino
  Pietro Rondoni

The following players received entry into the singles main draw as special exempts:
  Facundo Argüello
  Alejandro Davidovich Fokina

The following player received entry into the singles main draw as an alternate:
  Thiago Monteiro

The following players received entry from the qualifying draw:
  Marcelo Tomás Barrios Vera
  Mathias Bourgue
  Alexandre Müller
  Jan Šátral

The following players received entry as lucky losers:
  Oscar José Gutierrez
  Juan Pablo Varillas

Champions

Singles

 Federico Delbonis def.  Stefano Napolitano 6–4, 6–3.

Doubles

 Fabrício Neis /  David Vega Hernández def.  Rameez Junaid /  Purav Raja 6–4, 6–4.

External links
Official website

Thindown Challenger Biella
Tennis tournaments in Italy